The 2nd Chess Olympiad, organized by the Fédération Internationale des Échecs (FIDE) and comprising an open and women's tournament, as well as several events designed to promote the game of chess, took place between July 21 and August 6, 1928, in The Hague, Netherlands.

Results

Team standings

{| class="wikitable"
! # !!Country !! Players !! Points
|-
| style="background:gold;"|1 ||  Hungary || Nagy, Steiner, E., Vajda, Havasi || 44 
|-
| style="background:silver;"|2 ||  || Kashdan, Steiner, H., Factor, Tholfsen, Hanauer || 39½
|-
| style="background:#cc9966;"|3 ||  || Makarczyk, Frydman, Regedziński, Chwojnik, Blass || 37
|-
| 4 ||  || Hönlinger, Lokvenc, Müller, Wolf, Beutum || 36½
|-
| 5 ||  || Norman-Hansen, Andersen, Gemzøe, Ruben || 34
|-
| 6 ||  || Rivier, Gygli, Voellmy, Naegeli, Henneberger M., Michel || 34
|-
| 7 ||  || Gilg, Prokeš, Pokorný, Rejfíř, Schulz, Teller || 34
|-
| 8 ||  || Fernández Coria, Maderna, Palau, Reca, Grau || 33½
|-
| 9 ||  || Wagner, Hilse, Schönmann, Blümich, Foerder || 31½
|-
| 10 ||  || Weenink, Kroone, Van den Bosch, Schelfhout, Wertheim W., Wertheim J. || 31½
|-
| 11 ||  || Gaudin, Betbeder, Duchamp, Crépeaux, Muffang, Drezga || 31
|-
| 12 ||  || Sapira, Koltanowski, Censer I., Dunkelblum || 31
|-
| 13 ||  || Stoltz, Jacobson, Ståhlberg, Karlin, Jonsson || 31
|-
| 14 ||  || Apšenieks, Strautmanis, Petrovs, Taube, Melnbārdis || 30
|-
| 15 ||  || Monticelli, Sacconi, Hellmann, Calapso, De Nardo, Marotti || 26½
|-
| 16 ||  || Bródy, Proca, Balogh, Gudju || 25½
|-
| 17 ||  || Marín y Llovet, Cortes, Aguilera, Ribera, Molla || 13½
|}

Team results

Individual medals

No board order was applied and only top six individual results were awarded with a prize.
 Gold medal winner – Isaac Kashdan (United States), scoring 13/15 (86.7%);
 Silver medal winner – André Muffang (France), scoring 12½/16 (78.1%);
 Bronze medal winner – Teodor Regedziński (Poland), scoring 10/13 (76.9%);
 4–5th place – Endre Steiner (Hungary), scoring 11½/16 (71.9%);
 4–5th place – Géza Nagy (Hungary), scoring 11½/16 (71.9%); 
 6th place – William Rivier (Switzerland), scoring 7½/11 (68.2%).

Amateur World Championship

The second Amateur World Championship took place during the Olympiad. The final results were as follows:

{| class="wikitable"
! # !!Player !! Points !! BergerSystem
|-
| style="background:gold;"|1 ||  || 12 ||  
|-
| style="background:silver;"|2 ||  || 11 || 
|-
| style="background:#cc9966;"|3 ||  || 10 || 
|-
| 4 ||  ||  9½ || 66.25
|-
| 5 ||  ||  9½ || 64.50
|-
| 6 ||  ||  9½ || 57.25
|-
| 7 ||  ||  9 || 
|-
| 8 ||  ||  7 || 
|-
| 9 ||  ||  6 || 47.00
|-
| 10 ||  ||  6 || 41.75
|-
| 11 ||  ||  6 || 36.50
|-
| 12 ||  ||  5½ || 36.00
|-
| 13 ||  ||  5½ || 35.75
|-
| 14 ||  ||  5½ || 31.75
|-
| 15 ||  ||  5 || 
|-
| 16 ||  ||  3 || 
|}

Notes

References
2nd Chess Olympiad: The Hague 1928 OlimpBase

See also

1st Chess Olympiad (London 1927)
3rd Chess Olympiad (Hamburg 1930)

02
Olympiad 02
Sports competitions in The Hague
Olympiad 02
Chess Olympiad 02
20th century in The Hague
July 1928 sports events
August 1928 sports events